The Masonic Temple at 622 South Lincoln Street in Port Angeles, Washington is a historic masonic temple that was constructed in 1921 in Classical Revival style. Throughout the  early 20th century, temple members included some of  the  city's most prominent citizens. The building also served as  the  primary facility in Port Angeles for large social and civic 
gatherings. It is still in use today as a Masonic Lodge and also hosts many other events. 

It was added to the National Register of Historic Places in 1989.

References

External links
Port Angeles Masonic Bodies Website

Masonic buildings completed in 1921
Neoclassical architecture in Washington (state)
National Register of Historic Places in Port Angeles, Washington
Masonic buildings in Washington (state)